Planai is a World Cup ski course, located on the same name mountain and ski resort in Schladming, Styria, Austria, opened in 1973.

Since 1997 it is regular host of the night slalom, the highest attended in the circuit with 50,000 people each year.

Course hosted two World Championships in 1982 and 2013 and World Cup season final in 2012.

History
Opened in 1973 with dowhnill event and Franz Klammer as the winner. Until the end of the decade and trough eighties, all disciplines were regularly held on this course.

In 1982, they organized Alpine World Ski Championhips for the first time, with all men's events and only giant slalom event for women held on this course.

In 1988, they replaced originally scheduled Les Menuires (W) and Val Thorens (M) as season opening in the last minute due to weather conditions.

In 1990, they organized last World Cup weekend with downhill, slalom and combined events, before 7 years long break and entering new era.

In 1997, they organized first slalom under floodlight. Since then this became the most visited and most spectacular slalom in the world.

In 2013, they organized 2nd Alpine World Ski Championhips, completely renovated the finish area with recognizable arc of steel.

World Championships

Men's events

Women's events

Team event

World Cup

Men

Women

Alpine team event

Club5+ 
In 1986, elite Club5 was originally founded by prestigious classic downhill organizers: Kitzbühel, Wengen, Garmisch, Val d’Isère and Val Gardena/Gröden, with goal to bring alpine ski sport on the highest levels possible.

Later over the years other classic longterm organizers joined the now named Club5+: Alta Badia, Cortina, Kranjska Gora, Maribor, Lake Louise, Schladming, Adelboden, Kvitfjell, St.Moritz and Åre.

References

External links
thenightrace.at official site
FIS Alpine Ski World Cup – Schladming, Austria 
Ski-db.com - Schladming men's races

Ski areas in Austria